The uniform swiftlet, (Aerodramus vanikorensis), also known as the Vanikoro swiftlet or lowland swiftlet, is a gregarious, medium-sized swiftlet with a shallowly forked tail. The colouring is dark grey-brown, darker on the upperparts with somewhat paler underparts, especially on chin and throat. This species is widespread from the Philippines through Wallacea, New Guinea and Melanesia. It forages for flying insects primarily in lowland forests and open areas. It nests in caves where it uses its sense of echolocation, rare in birds, to navigate.

Description
The uniform swiftlet is a gregarious, medium-sized swiftlet with a shallowly forked tail. It is about 13 cm long with a wingspan averaging around 27 cm. It weighs about 11 grams. The colouring is dark grey-brown, darker on the upperparts with paler underparts, especially on chin and throat. It is similar to, and most likely to be confused with, the white-rumped swiftlet or mountain swiftlet.

Taxonomy
Several subspecies are recognised, and the form A. v. inquietus is often split as the island swiftlet, A. inquietus.

Distribution
This species is widespread from the Philippines through Wallacea, New Guinea and Melanesia. It has been recorded as a rare vagrant to Australia, from Cape York Peninsula and islands in Torres Strait.

Habitat
The uniform swiftlet forages over lowland forests and open areas. It roosts in caves and sinkholes, mostly in limestone areas. Sometimes man-made tunnels or structures are used.

Food
This species feeds on flying insects, especially ants.

Breeding
This species nests colonially in caves where it uses echolocation to navigate. The nest is a shallow cup of mossy material and saliva, usually attached to a vertical surface of a cave wall in the completely dark zone. On Guam, Neckeropsis lepiniana, is used as the nesting material and in Hawaii, a liverwort (Herberta spp.) is used. One or two white eggs form the clutch. The incubation period is at least twelve days and the young may take thirty-five days to fledge.

Status
The uniform swiftlet has a very large range and that they are locally common and in some places abundant within that range. The population has not been quantified but is believed to be stable. The birds face no particular threats, and as a result, the IUCN has listed it as being of "Least Concern".

References

 Beehler, Bruce M.; & Finch, Brian W. (1985). Species Checklist of the Birds of New Guinea. RAOU Monograph No.1. Royal Australasian Ornithologists Union: Melbourne. 
 Beehler, Bruce M.; Pratt, Thane K.; & Zimmerman, Dale A. (1986). Birds of New Guinea. Wau Ecology Handbook No.9. Princeton University Press. 
 Coates, Brian J. (1985). The Birds of Papua New Guinea. Volume 1: Non-Passerines. Dover Publications: Alderley, Queensland. 
 Higgins, P.J. (ed). (1999). Handbook of Australian, New Zealand and Antarctic Birds. Volume 4: Parrots to Dollarbird. Oxford University Press: Melbourne. 

uniform swiftlet
Birds of the Maluku Islands
Birds of Melanesia
Birds of the Philippines
Birds of Sulawesi
uniform swiftlet
Taxa named by Jean René Constant Quoy
Taxa named by Joseph Paul Gaimard